AGCO Power (previously AGCO Sisu Power and Sisu Diesel) is a Finnish company and a subsidiary of US-based AGCO Corporation. The company, situated in Linnavuori, Nokia, Finland, manufactures diesel engines for various applications, such as agricultural machines.

History 
During its history, AGCO Power has operated under five different owners:

 Valmet, a company known for paper machines
 Sisu Auto, manufacturer of trucks
 Partek, which manufactured various non-diesel-powered equipment
 Kone, a manufacturer of elevators and escalators
 AGCO, a global manufacturer of agricultural machines and solutions.

The company was born out of a former unit of Valmet's Linnavuori plant.

Part of the Finnish state aircraft factory (1936–1943) 
The State Aircraft Factory (Valtion lentokonetehdas in Finnish) began its operation 1936 in Härmälä.

In 1942 a mining operation began in Linnavuori to make room for the engine department. Between 1000 and 1300 Linnavuori had been used as a fortress.

Valmet plant in Linnavuori (1944–1994) 
Parts for aerial fighters were first manufactured in Linnavuori in 1944. The production of engines begun in 1946 and in 1991 the plant introduced a completely new diesel engine model. Under Valmet's ownership the plant produced approximately 5000 engine units. Manufacturing of engines in Brazil began in 1993. In 1994 Valmet sold its tractor business to Sisu, along the engine plant in Linnavuori.

Sisu Diesel (1995–2008) 
Sisu Diesel began its operation in 1995. In 1997 the Finnish Government sold Sisu, including Sisu Diesel, to Partek.

Since the beginning of 2000s the company began cooperation with the German company Bosch, which had previously focused to car and industrial machine electronics. The partnership led to a control unit used in Sisu Diesel engines.

In 2002 Kone purchased Partek. Two years later AGCO purchased Valtra and its subsidiary Sisu Diesel from Kone. Previously AGCO had used engines from eight different manufacturers.

In December 2006 it was told that AGCO would invest 30 million euros to double the capacity of the Linnavuori plant.

In 2007 Cramo bought the diesel generator rental business from Sisu Diesel. The same year the engine assembly line in Linnavuori became fully automated.

AGCO Sisu Power (2008–2012) 

In October 2008 a new 7-cylinder, 9,8-liter engine was introduced. It was producing 400 to 500 horsepower. Mass production of the engine began in 2010.

In the spring of 2010, the pipe manufacturing was modernized with robot controlled by machine vision, achieving an output of three human workers. AGCO Sisu Power manufactured approximately 30 000 engines annually, supplying over half of the engines needed by AGCO. AGCO and Concern Tractor Plants (CPT), Russia's largest manufacturer of agricultural equipment, had a joint venture in Vladimir, near Moscow where AGCO Sisu Power engines were assembled from parts shipped from Finland. The engines were then used in CPT's own equipment.

AGCO Power (2012–) 
In 2012 the company, now called AGCO Power, began operations in China at a new plant in Changzhou. In 2014 the Linnavuori plant was expanded to produce larger engine models. AGCO Power employed about 850 people in Finland. An AGCO Power plant was opened in Argentina. A millionth AGCO Power engine was assembled in November 2017. The turnover of the company was roughly 310 million euros.

In January 2019 AGCO informed that it was investing over 100 million euros in AGCO Power's Linnavuori plant. The investment would expand manufacturing, logistics and showroom areas of the plant and would enable an annual output of 50 000 engines. Collaborative robots, which work together with humans, were added to the assembly process while previously they had been separated from human workers by barriers. In addition to advanced robotics, the expansion included an automated logistics center and machining line.

Organization 
Established in 1990, the corporation has expanded by acquiring various equipment manufacturers like Challenger, Fendt, GSI and Massey Ferguson. In Finland AGCO owns AGCO Power and Valtra Oy Ab, which manufactures Valtra tractors in Suolahti.

In 2021 AGCO Power manufactured engines in Linnavuori, in Mogi das Cruzes (Brazil), in Changzhou (China) and in General Rodríguez (Argentina). The plants were able to reach a combined annual output of over 100 000 engines. The company's product development was located in its main plant in Finland which is using robotics in various stages of the manufacturing and assembly process. The Linnavuori plant has over 100 robots. The Lean manufacturing methods are used in running AGCO Power plants. For example, the goal is to increase the productivity of the plant by 6% annually and performance is measured daily.

The company has a research and development center at the Tampere University campus focusing on electronics and software.

Products 
In 2019 80% of engines produced by AGCO Power were used in AGCO corporation's own equipment: Valtra,  Massey Ferguson, Fendt and Challenger tractors. Third-party applications were, among others, forestry machines, combines, material handling machines, power generators and industrial machines. In 2019 roughly 5000 engines were sold to third-party customers. Some of the AGCO Power engines use after treatment systems created by Proventia, and controlled by software made by Bitwise.

The production of low-emission four and six-cylinder industrial diesel engines will begin in 2022. Their power range is between 100 and 300 kW, and they can be used also in trucks. They are  lighter than the company's older engine models.

The plant also manufactures gearwheels, power generators, gearboxes, gearbox components and backup power solutions. Gearwheels, axles, and gears manufactured by AGCO Power are used for example in BRB Finland's Lynx and Ski-Doo snow mobiles.

In 2022, AGCO Power announced its first engine design that will be compatible with renewable HVO fuels such as hydrogen, ethanol, methanol, and biogas with the CORE engine platform.

Engine Models 
The following table lists the lineup of diesel engines produced by AGCO Power at one or more facilities as of 2022.

Recognitions 

 In 2013 AGCO Power received the Pirkanmaa Award
 In 2018 AGCO Power received the Pirkanmaa Export Award

References

External links 
 AGCO Power

Companies of Finland
Engine manufacturers of Finland